"Christian Woman" is a single by gothic metal band Type O Negative from their 1993 album Bloody Kisses. It is one of two songs (the other being "Black No. 1") that people credit with propelling the band into the mainstream. The song is inspired by a real woman Peter Steele with whom he was once romantically involved. Steele told Revolver, "She was a Roman Catholic, much as I am, but she would get off on breaking the rules a little bit. She would ask me to dress up as a priest and, well, I guess you can just imagine what would happen after that. So, I guess you could say I have a bit of a priest infection."

Music videos
Two music videos exist for this song. The most well-known video, directed by Jon Reiss, uses the radio edit of the song, which is four minutes and twenty-four seconds long. The other video uses the longer album version of the song, which has a significantly longer runtime of eight minutes and fifty-eight seconds. Both videos are available on the 1998 video album After Dark.

Tracklist
All songs written by Peter Steele

Personnel
 Peter Steele – lead vocals, bass guitar
 Kenny Hickey – guitar, backing vocals
 Josh Silver – keyboard, synthesizer, effects and programming, backing vocals
 Sal Abruscato – drums, percussion

References

External links
 
 

Type O Negative songs
1993 singles
Songs critical of religion
Songs written by Peter Steele
Roadrunner Records singles